Boisleux-Saint-Marc is a commune in the Pas-de-Calais department in the Hauts-de-France region in northern France.

Geography
A farming village located 7 miles (11 km) south of Arras on the D35 road.

Population

Sights
 The church of St. Médard, rebuilt after the destruction of the village during World War I.

See also
Communes of the Pas-de-Calais department

References

External links

  War Cemetery

Communes of Pas-de-Calais
World War I cemeteries in France